Memory is a 2016 album by Dan Michaelson and The Coastguards. It is the final installment in an album trilogy that commenced with 2013's Blindspot and continued with Distance in 2014. The album was written and produced by Michaelson and mixed by Ash Workman (Metronomy, Christine and the Queens). The album was recorded at The Premises, London and is available on CD, vinyl and digital. Joining the Coastguards (Henry Spenner, Laurie Earle and Horse) are Romeo Stodart of The Magic Numbers and Johnny Flynn. 
"I went looking for a way to carry what I'd written. Memory is the end point of this particular story. In my small world, Blindspot is the script, Distance is the play, and Memory is the widescreen movie." — Dan Michaelson

Track listing

Personnel
Performers
Dan Michaelson (vocals, guitar, piano)
Henry Spenner (drums)
Laurie Earle (guitar, piano)
Horse (guitar)
Romeo Stodart (bass)
Ali Friend (double bass)
Gabriel Stebbing
Johnny Flynn (violin and flugelhorn)
Jin Theriault (baritone sax)
Yusuf Narcin (trombone)
Christo Squire (alto sax).

Production
Dan Michaelson
Ash Workman

References

External links

Official YouTube

2016 albums